The fifth and final series of the British television drama series Ackley Bridge premiered on All 4 on 11 July 2022. It was later broadcast on Channel 4. The series follows the lives of the staff and pupils at the fictional multi-cultural academy school Ackley Bridge College, in the fictitious Yorkshire mill town of Ackley Bridge. The commissioning of the series was confirmed in June 2021 and filming commenced in November of that year. The series consists of ten thirty-minute episodes that were transmitted in the revised timeslot of 10pm on Channel 4.

Production and casting
On 17 June 2021, it was announced in a report by Production Weekly that production on the fifth series of Ackley Bridge had commenced that week. Channel 4 formally announced the renewal of Ackley Bridge in November 2021 and said that the fifth series would follow the second half of the school year that began in the previous series. They revealed that actor Ashley Walters would make his directorial debut by directing half of the series, with the remaining five episodes helmed by Reza Moradi. Writers included Damian Mullen, Alexander Stewart and Emteaz Hussain. The role of Marina Dobson was recast to Megan Morgan as opposed to previous actress Carla Woodcock. New castings for the series included Adam Little as Kyle Dobson, the younger brother of Marina, and Laila Zaidi as Asma Farooqi, a new "hotshot teacher [who] ruffles some feathers".

The Halifax Courier confirmed that filming for the series would commence in November 2021. Shortly after filming began, it was announced that drag queen Baga Chipz had been cast in a guest role for the series. In June 2022, it was announced by Digital Spy that the fifth series would air on Channel 4 in July of that year. Promotional photos and storyline teasers were also released. On 11 July, the series premiered on All4. That same night, it begin airing on Channel 4 at the revised timeslot of 10pm. The series aired two episodes per night over the course of a week.

Cast

Main

Recurring

Guest

Episodes

References

2022 British television seasons
Series 5